A Scratch in the Sky (1967) is the second album by The Cryan' Shames. For this album, new members Isaac Guillory and Lenny Kerley join the lineup. Dave Purple and Jerry Stone are no longer listed on the credits. On their second album, the Cryan' Shames shifted from the heavy British Invasion and Byrds influences of their debut into a more California sunshine pop-flavored sound, without abandoning their debts to the Beatles and the Byrds altogether. On this second album, all but 2 songs are original compositions by Jim Fairs and Lenny Kerley.

Track listing
All tracks composed and arranged by Jim Fairs and Lenny Kerley, except where indicated.

Side 1:
"A Carol for Lorelei" - 4:05
"The Sailing Ship" - 3:36
"In The Cafe" - 3:12
"Mr. Unreliable" - 2:52
"The Town I'd Like To Go Back To" - 4:30

Side 2:
"Up on the Roof" (Gerry Goffin, Carole King) - 3:23
"It Could Be We're in Love" - 2:35
"Sunshine Psalm" - 2:17
"I Was Lonely When" - 4:03
"Cobblestone Road (She's Been Walkin')" - 2:51
"Dennis Dupree from Danville" (Jeffrey Boyan, Ron Holden) - 3:12

Personnel 
The Cryan' Shames
Tom "Toad" Doody - lead vocals, autoharp, bells
Jim "J C Hooke" Pilster - tambourine
Dennis Conroy - drums
Jim Fairs - arranger, bagpipes, bass, flute, guitar, mandolin, vocals
Isaac Guillory - accordion, bass, cello, guitar, keyboards, vocals
Lenny Kerley - arranger, bass, guitar, tambora, vocals

References

1967 albums
The Cryan' Shames albums
Columbia Records albums